Gríma, called (the) Wormtongue, is a fictional character in J. R. R. Tolkien's The Lord of the Rings. He serves as the secondary antagonist of The Two Towers and a minor antagonist in The Return of the King, and his role is expanded in Unfinished Tales. He is introduced in The Two Towers as the chief advisor to King Théoden of Rohan and henchman of Saruman. 

To some psychologists, Wormtongue serves as an archetypal sycophant. Tolkien scholars note that Tolkien based Wormtongue on the untrustworthy character Unferth in Beowulf. He is presumptive, behaving as if he already rules Rohan, and exemplifies lechery, as correctly guessed by Gandalf; he hopes to become rich, and to take Éowyn as the woman he desires. 

The name Gríma derives from the Old English or Icelandic word meaning "mask", "helmet" or "spectre".

Appearances

The Two Towers

Gríma, son of Gálmód, was at first a faithful servant, but he eventually fell in league with Saruman, and from then on worked to weaken Théoden and his kingdom through lies and persuasion, in his position as chief advisor to the King.

Tolkien describes him as "a wizened figure of a man, with a pale wise face, and heavy lidded eyes", and a "long pale tongue". Gríma was widely disliked in Edoras; everyone except Théoden called him "Wormtongue". In Old English wyrm means "serpent, snake, dragon", and Gandalf repeatedly compares him to a snake:

   
Saruman had promised him Éowyn, the king's niece, as a reward for his services. Her brother Éomer accused him of "watching her under his lids and haunting her steps". His schemes were foiled when Gandalf the White and his companions arrived at Edoras, and convinced the king that he was not as weak as his adviser had made him seem. Upon Théoden's restoration, "many things which men had missed" were found locked in Gríma's trunk, including the king's sword, Herugrim. Théoden decided to go forth to battle at the Fords of Isen, and Gríma was given a choice: prove his loyalty and ride into battle with the king, or ride into exile. Choosing the latter, he went to Saruman at Orthanc. Following the confrontation between Saruman and Gandalf, Gríma mistakenly threw the palantír of Orthanc at the Rohirrim accompanying Gandalf, or possibly at Saruman himself, and so permitted its capture by Peregrin Took.

The Return of the King

Gríma accompanied Saruman to the Shire, where Saruman sought revenge for his defeat at Orthanc in petty tyranny over the Hobbits. During this time, Saruman shortened Gríma's nickname to "Worm". When Saruman was overthrown by a hobbit rebellion and ordered to leave, Frodo Baggins implored Gríma not to follow him, and even offered him food and shelter. Saruman countered by revealing to the Hobbits that Gríma had murdered and possibly eaten Lotho Sackville-Baggins, a kinsman of Frodo; whereupon Gríma killed Saruman and was shot by Hobbit archers.

Unfinished Tales

Gríma played a major role in the back-story to The Lord of the Rings, prior to his first appearance in The Two Towers. In Unfinished Tales Tolkien writes that Gríma was captured by the Nazgûl in the fields of the Rohirrim, while on his way to Isengard to inform Saruman of Gandalf's arrival at Edoras. He divulged what he knew of Saruman's plans to the Nazgûl, specifically his interest in the Shire, and its location. Gríma was set free, and the Nazgûl set out immediately for the Shire. In another version within the same chapter, this role is given to the squint-eyed southerner that the hobbits encounter at Bree. Tolkien further suggests that Gríma may have given Théoden "subtle poisons" that caused him to age at an accelerated pace.

Interpretations

To the psychologists Deborah and Mark Parker, Wormtongue serves as an archetypal sycophant, flatterer, liar, and manipulator. 

Tolkien scholars have noted that Wormtongue's interaction with Gandalf in Meduseld has an Old English counterpart in the epic poem Beowulf: the account is closely based on the hero Beowulf's dealings with Unferth in Heorot, where Unferth is King Hrothgar's "ambiguous" spokesman; Unferth is thoroughly discredited by Beowulf, as Wormtongue is by Gandalf.

The critic Charles W. Nelson describes Wormtongue's attitude as an example of presumption, behaving "as if he were already on the throne" of Rohan. Nelson notes that Richard Purtill suggests that Tolkien is intentionally embodying the seven deadly sins in his characters. He quotes from one of Tolkien's letters to this effect: "the encouragement of good morals in this real world, by the ancient device of exemplifying them in unfamiliar embodiments, that may tend to 'bring them home.'" Clark writes that Dwarves exemplify greed, Men pride, Elves envy, Ents sloth, Hobbits gluttony, Orcs anger, and Wormtongue lechery. That lechery is, Nelson notes, correctly guessed by Gandalf: that he would gain a large share in Meduseld's treasure, and Éowyn's hand in marriage, "on whose person Grima had long cast lecherous eyes and lascivious looks", and indeed in Éomer's words that Grima had "haunted her steps".

Portrayal in adaptations

In Ralph Bakshi's 1978 animated film adaptation of The Lord of the Rings, Wormtongue was voiced by Michael Deacon.

In Peter Jackson's Lord of the Rings films, Wormtongue was played by Brad Dourif, described in The Guardian as an "unnerving presence" and in The Independent as a "snivelling sidekick urging his master on to acts of increasing depravity". According to Dourif, Jackson encouraged him to shave off his eyebrows so that the audience would immediately have a subliminal reaction of unease to the character.

"The Scouring of the Shire" episode with the deaths of both Saruman and Wormtongue does not appear in the film version; the deaths were moved to an earlier scene, "The Voice of Saruman". The cut scene can be found on the Extended Edition DVD of The Return of the King.

References

Primary
This list identifies each item's location in Tolkien's writings.

Secondary

Middle-earth Rohirrim
The Lord of the Rings characters
Fictional advisors
Fictional murderers
Fictional henchmen
Fictional cannibals
Literary characters introduced in 1954
Male literary villains
Male film villains